Ashlaa is a Moroccan 2010 documentary film.

Synopsis 
In Pieces is a posy of images taken over the last ten years that show family moments, reflections on life and death, on disappointments and successes, on aging and exile. This family chronicle becomes the chronicle of a country, of a society, as observed by Hakim Belabbes from inside and outside.

Awards 
 Festival de Tánger 2011

External links 

2010 films
Moroccan documentary films
2010 documentary films
Documentary films about families